The Vajont Dam (or Vaiont Dam) is a disused dam in northern Italy.

The dam was conceived in the 1920s and eventually built between 1957 and 1960 by Società Adriatica di Elettricità (SADE), at the time the electricity supply and distribution monopoly in northeastern Italy. The engineer was Carlo Semenza (1893–1961). In 1962 the dam was nationalized and came under the control of ENEL as part of the Italian Ministry for Public Works.

The dam remained almost intact and two thirds of the water was retained behind it.

This event occurred after ENEL and the Italian government concealed reports and dismissed evidence that Monte Toc, on the southern side of the basin, was geologically unstable. They had disregarded numerous warnings, signs of danger and negative appraisals. Underestimating the size of the landslide, ENEL's attempt to safely control the landslide by lowering the lake's level came when disaster was almost imminent.

Construction
The dam was built by SADE, the electricity supply and distribution monopoly in north-eastern Italy. The owner, Giuseppe Volpi di Misurata, had been Mussolini's Minister of Finances for several years. The 'tallest dam in the world', across the Vajont Gorge, was conceived in the 1920s to harness the Piave, Mae and Boite rivers, to meet the growing demand for power generation and industrialization. Not until the confusion after Mussolini's fall during World War II was the project authorized, on 15 October 1943.

The dam and basin were intended to be at the centre of a complex water management system in which water would have been channeled from nearby valleys and artificial basins at higher levels. Tens of kilometres of concrete pipes and pipe-bridges across valleys were planned.

In the 1950s, SADE's monopoly was confirmed by post-fascist governments, and it bought the land despite opposition by the communities of Erto and Casso in the valley, which was overcome with government and police support. SADE stated that the geology of the gorge had been studied, including analysis of ancient landslides and that the mountain was believed to be sufficiently stable.

Construction work started in 1957 but by 1959 shifts and fractures were noticed while building a new road on the side of Monte Toc. This led to new studies in which three experts separately told SADE that the entire side of Monte Toc was unstable and would be likely to collapse into the basin if the filling were completed. SADE took no notice and construction was completed in October 1959; in February 1960, SADE was authorised to start filling the basin. In 1962 the dam was nationalized and came under the control of ENEL as part of the Italian Ministry for Public Works.

Early signs of disaster
On 22 March 1959, during construction of the Vajont Dam, a landslide at the nearby Pontesei Dam created a  wave that killed one person.

Throughout the summer of 1960, minor landslides and earth movements were noticed. Instead of heeding these warning signs, the Italian government chose to sue the handful of journalists reporting the problems for "undermining the social order".

In October 1961, after the completion of the gallery, SADE resumed filling the narrow reservoir under controlled monitoring. SADE downplayed the importance of these quakes, and was then authorized to fill the reservoir to the maximum level.

In July 1962, SADE's own engineers reported the results of model-based experiments on the effects of further landslides from Monte Toc into the lake. A decision was made to fill the basin beyond that, because the engineers thought they could control the rate of the landslide by controlling the level of water in the reservoir.

In March 1963, the dam was transferred to the newly constituted government service for electricity, ENEL. During the following summer, with the basin almost completely filled, slides, shakes, and movements of the ground were continuously reported by the alarmed population.

The tests of the hydraulic model of the Vajont tank 
 

After the discovery of the landslide on the northern slopes of Monte Toc, it was decided to deepen the studies on the following effects:
 dynamic actions on the dam;
 wave effects in the reservoir and possible dangers for nearby locations, with particular attention to the town of Erto;
 Hypothesis of a partial breakage of the dam and consequent examination of the rout wave and its propagation along the last stretch of the Vajont and along the Piave, up to Soverzene and beyond.

The study of point 1 was performed at the I.S.M.E.S.  (Experimental Institute for Models and Structures) of Bergamo, while for the others the SADE decided to build a physical-hydraulic model of the basin, in which to perform some experiments on the effects of a landslide fall in a reservoir.

The 1: 200 scale model of the basin, which can still be visited today, was set up at the SADE hydroelectric plant in Nove (loc. Borgo Botteon di Vittorio Veneto), and became the C.I.M. (Hydraulic Models Centre).  The experiments were entrusted to professors Ghetti and Marzolo, university professors of the Institute of Hydraulics and Hydraulic Constructions of the University of Padua, and were carried out with funding of SADE, under the control of the study office of the company itself.

The study aimed to verify the hydraulic effects on the dam and on the banks of the landslide reservoir, and was therefore directed in this sense rather than reproducing the natural phenomenon of the landslide.  The experiments were carried out in two different series (August–September 1961 and January–April 1962), of which the first served substantially to refine the model.

The first set of experiments 
The first series of 5 experiments began on August 30, 1961 with a sliding surface of the flat landslide inclined by 30°, consisting of a wooden plank covered with a sheet. The sliding mass was simulated with gravel, held in place by flexible metal nets, which were initially held in position by ropes that were then suddenly released.  At the beginning of September, another 4 tests were carried out intended for orientation purposes.  The first always with a 30° inclined plane, the following 3 with a 42° inclined plane. Having found it impossible to reproduce the natural geological phenomenon of the landslide in the model, the model was elaborated by modifying the movement surface of the landslide, which was replaced with a masonry one (the relative profiles were elaborated by Semenza, who also used the surveys that had already been carried out and that had provided sufficient elements of judgment in this sense), to make it possible to vary the speed of the landslide fall into the reservoir (made difficult by the new "back" shape of the movement surface).  To simulate the compactness of the moving material (which in the model remained the gravel) rigid sectors were inserted which were towed by ropes pulled by a tractor.

The second set of experiments 
In these 17 experiments, conducted from January 3, 1962 to April 24, 1962, the "collapsing" material was still gravel, this time held in place by hemp nets and cords.  Starting from the Muller hypothesis relating to the different characteristics of the mass moving between the downstream part of the Massalezza stream (west) and the upstream part of the same (east), all the experiments were performed by making those two hypothetical parts of the landslide descend separately. In the model, however, the two landslides were initially made to descend at different times, so that their effects were totally separate and, subsequently, when the wave produced by the first came back, so as to obtain a total increase in the water of the even greater lake.

The final Ghetti report 
The total increase of the water in the tank (measured by means of special instruments) was broken down into "static increase", which was the non-transient effect of increasing the level of the water left in the tank after the landslide due to the immersion of the landslide in the tank (once the state of rest is reached again), and in "dynamic boost", due to the temporary wave motion produced by the landslide.  The static boost depended on the volume of the landslide that remained immersed in the tank, while the dynamic boost depended almost exclusively on the speed of the landslide fall (while it was negligibly linked to the volume of the same).

Based on this simulation (following the disaster object of criticism, as considered approximate by some) it was determined that by placing a reservoir limit at an altitude of  there would be no damage above  a.s.l.  along the banks of the reservoir, while a minimum quantity of water would have exceeded the edge of the dam causing negligible damage downstream of the same.

With the reported experiences, carried out on a 1:200 scale model of the Vajont lake-reservoir, we tried to provide an evaluation of the effects that will be caused by a landslide, which is possible to occur on the left bank upstream of the dam.  .  Given that the extreme limit downstream of the landslide is more than 75 m from the embankment of the dam, and that the formation of this embankment is of compact and consistent rock and well distinct, even geologically, from the aforementioned mass, it is absolutely not to be fear of any static perturbation to the dam with the occurrence of the landslide, and therefore only the effects of the wave rise in the lake and in the overflow on the dam crest as a consequence of the fall are to be considered.

Landslide and wave
 

On 9 October 1963, engineers saw trees falling and rocks rolling down into the lake where the predicted landslide would take place. Before this, the alarming rate of movement of the landslide had not slowed as a result of lowering the water, although the water had been lowered to what SADE believed was a safe level to contain the displacement wave should a catastrophic landslide occur. With a major landslide now imminent, engineers gathered on top of the dam that evening to witness the tsunami.

In 20 seconds it reached the water level; by 45 seconds the landslide (now at rest) had completely filled the Vajont reservoir. The impact displaced  of water in approximately 25 seconds,  of which overtopped the dam in a  wave.

The impact with the water generated three waves. One went upwards, reached the houses of Casso, fell back onto the landslide and went to dig the basin of the pond of Massalezza. Another headed toward the shores of the lake and, through a washout action of the same, destroyed some localities in the municipality of Erto e Casso.

The death toll was about 2,000 people (official data speaks of 1,917 victims, but it is not possible to determine with certainty the number).

The firefighters who departed from Belluno, after receiving reports about the raising of the level of the Piave, could not reach the location, since from a certain point onwards the road, coming from the valley, had been completely ripped off. Longarone was reached by firefighters who departed Pieve di Cadore, who were the first to realize what had happened and were able to communicate it.  At 5:30 a.m. on 10 October 1963, the first soldiers of the Italian Army arrived to bring relief and recover the dead.  Among the soldiers involved there were above all Alpini, some of which belonged to the combat engineers, who dug by hand to seek the bodies of the missing.  They also found safes of the banks of the country, no longer able to be opened with normal keys as they were damaged. The Firefighters from 46 Provincial Commands also participated in the rescue, with 850 men, including divers, land and helicopter teams and many vehicles and equipment.  The Nucleo Sommozzatori of Genoa, with 8 personnel, was used in the basin in front of the Busche Dam, for dredging to search for bodies and drums of toxic substances (61 cyanide drums), with subsequent patrol by immersion and final removal of sludge when the basin was dry.  Of the approximately 2,000 fatalities, only 1,500 bodies have been summarily recovered and recomposed, half of which are impossible to recognize.

Many small villages near the landslide along the lakefront suffered damage from a giant displacement wave.

Estimates of the dead range from 1,900 to 2,500 people, and approximately 350 families lost all members. Most of the survivors had lost relatives and friends along with their homes and belongings.

The dam was largely undamaged. The top  or so of masonry was washed away, but the basic structure remained intact and exists today.

Causes and responsibility
Immediately after the disaster, the government (which owned the dam), politicians and public authorities insisted on attributing the tragedy to an unexpected and unavoidable natural event.

The debate in the newspapers was heavily influenced by politics. The paper l'Unità, the mouthpiece of the Partito Comunista Italiano (PCI), was the first to denounce the actions of the management and government, as it had previously carried a number of articles by  addressing the behaviour of the SADE management in the Vajont project and elsewhere. Indro Montanelli, then the most influential Italian journalist and a vocal anti-communist, attacked l'Unità and denied any human responsibility; l'Unità and the PCI were dubbed "jackals, speculating on pain and on the dead" in many articles by La Domenica del Corriere and a national campaign poster paid for by the Christian Democracy, the party of prime minister Giovanni Leone. They attributed the catastrophe only to natural causes and God's will.

The campaign accused the PCI of sending agitprops into the refugee communities, as relief personnel; most of them were partisans from Emilia Romagna who fought on Mount Toc in the Second World War and often had friends in the stricken area.

The Christian Democracy accused the Communist Party of "political profiteering" from the tragedy. Leone promised to bring justice to the people killed in the disaster. A few months after he lost the premiership, he became the head of SADE's team of lawyers, who significantly reduced the amount of compensation for the survivors and ruled out payment for at least 600 victims.

The Democrazia Cristiana's newspaper, La Discussione, called the disaster "a mysterious act of God's love", in an article that drew sharp criticism from l'Unità.

Apart from journalistic attacks and the attempted cover-up from news sources aligned with the government, there had been proven flaws in the geological assessments, and disregard of warnings about the likelihood of a disaster by SADE, ENEL and the government.

The trial was moved to L'Aquila, in Abruzzo, by the judges who heard the preliminary trial, thus preventing public participation, and resulted in lenient sentencing for a handful of the SADE and ENEL engineers. One SADE engineer (Mario Pancini) committed suicide in 1968. The government never sued SADE for damage compensation.

Subsequent engineering analysis has focused on the cause of the landslide, and there is ongoing debate about the contribution of rainfall, dam level changes and earthquakes as triggers of the landslide, as well as differing views about whether it was an old landslide that slipped further or a completely new one.

There were a number of problems with the choice of site for the dam and reservoir: the canyon was steep sided, the river had undercut its banks, and the limestone and claystone rocks that made up the walls of the canyon were inter-bedded with the slippery clay-like Lias and Dogger Jurassic-period horizons and the Cretaceous-period Malm horizon, all of which were inclined towards the axis of the canyon. In addition, the limestone layers contained many solution caverns that became only more saturated because of rains in September.

Reconstruction
Those who insisted on returning to their mountain life in Erto e Casso were strongly discouraged. Longarone and other villages in the Piave Valley were rebuilt with modern houses and farms.

The government used the disaster to promote the industrialization of the north-east of Italy. Survivors were entitled to 'business start-up' loans, public subsidies and ten years tax exemption, all of which they could 'sell on' to major companies from the Venice region. These concessions were then converted into millions of lira for industrial plants elsewhere. Among the corporations were Zanussi (now owned by Electrolux), Ceramica Dolomite (now owned by American Standard), Confezioni SanRemo, and SAVIC (now owned by Italcementi).

Compensation measures did not clearly differentiate between victims and people who lived nearby; thus much of the compensation went to people who had suffered little damage, creating a negative public image.

A pumping station was installed in the dam basin to keep the lake at a constant level, and the bypass gallery was lengthened beyond the dam to let the water flow down to the Piave Valley. The dam wall is still in place and maintained, but there are no plans to exploit it. The dry basin, filled with landslip, has been open to visitors since 2002.

The dam today and memorials
In recent years there has been a revival of interest both by researchers with specialist interest, and sightseers. The dam, now owned by ENEL, was partially opened to the public in 2002 with guided tours and access to the walkway along the top and other locations. In September 2006 an annual non-competitive track event, called "Paths of Remembrance", was inaugurated, which allows participants to access some locations inside the mountain.

On 12 February 2008, in launching the International Year of Planet Earth, UNESCO cited the Vajont Dam tragedy as one of five "cautionary tales" caused by "the failure of engineers and geologists".

For 2013, on the occasion of the fiftieth anniversary of the disaster, the region of Venice set aside one million euros for safety works and recovery of tunnels inside the mountain which were part of the Colomber Road (the old national road 251).

The memorial church in Longarone—constructed over the strong opposition of the surviving parish priest—is a late masterpiece of the famous architect Giovanni Michelucci.

In the media
After the initial worldwide reporting, the tragedy became regarded as part of the price of economic growth in the 1950s and 1960s.

In 2001, a docudrama about the disaster was released. A joint production of Italian and French companies, it was titled Vajont—La diga del disonore ("Vajont—The Dam of Dishonour") in Italy, and La Folie des hommes ("The Madness of Men") in France. It stars Michel Serrault and Daniel Auteuil.

The tragedy was included in the 2008 documentary series Disasters of the Century.

The TV show Seconds from Disaster featured the event in episode two, "Mountain Tsunami," of its fifth season in 2012.

In 2013, the eleventh stage of the Giro d'Italia finished in Vajont to commemorate the fiftieth anniversary of the disaster.

In March 2018, the dam and the disaster were also covered in Season 2, Episode 1 ("Armageddon Highway") of Science Channel's Mysteries of the Abandoned.

See also

 List of natural disasters by death toll
 List of dams and reservoirs
 Malpasset Dam
 Seiche
 St. Francis Dam

References

Bibliography
 Franco Mantovania and Claudio Vita-Finzi, 'Neotectonics of the Vajont dam site', Geomorphology, Vol. 54, Issues 1–2, 2003, pp 33–37.
 David Petley, Landslide information: The Vajont (Vaiont) Landslide, 2001. Retrieved January 2008.
 Suburban Emergency Management Project (SEMP), 'Epic Vajont Dam Disaster, Italy, 1963: Manmade or Natural?', Biot #373: 17 June 2006. Retrieved January 2008.

Video materials 
 of 3D simulation of the wave generated by the Vajont rockslide.

External links

 Kiersch, G. A. The Vajont Reservoir Disaster. Mineral Information Service, July 1965, pp. 129–38. 
 Vajont dam disaster: a fascist legacy 
 Vajont forecast manslaughter 
 Sito documentale antimafia Vajont 
 Eyewitnesses, 1964's original movie (2.000 condanne) 
 The last outrage: in fact, a mere commercial business. Again... 
 ...Testuale: i festeggiamenti del cinquantesimo della tragedia 
 Vajont, l'onda lunga, Lucia Vastano. Libro inchiesta, testo di corso IUAV Venezia 
 Il disastro del Vajont 
 Comitato Sopravissuti del Vajont 
 Vajont: Almost a Greek Tragedy 
 
 Vajont dam photos and virtual field trip (University of Wisconsin). Retrieved 2 July 2009
 

Arch dams
Dams in Italy
Dam failures in Europe
Vajont Dam
Disasters in Italy
Floods in Italy
1963 in Italy
1963 industrial disasters
Dams completed in 1959
Landslides in Italy
Landslides in 1963
October 1963 events in Europe
1959 establishments in Italy
First 100 IUGS Geological Heritage Sites